Villa La Gaeta is an eclectic villa located in San Siro on the shores of Lake Como, Italy.

History 
The villa, designed by Italian architects and brothers Gino and Adolfo Coppedè, was built in 1921 on behalf of the Ambrosoli family.

In 2006, the villa served as a filming location for some scenes of the 2006 film Casino Royale.

Description 
The building features an eclectic style that combines Gothic Revival and Art Nouveau elements. A large tower with biforas crowned by a loggia characterizes the façade overlooking the lake. The style of Villa La Gaeta is also featured by another Lake Como villa, Villa Pessina, a fact which has fueled plagiarism accusations toward the designers of the latter over the time.

Gallery

References

External links

Villa La Gaeta on Lombardia Beni Culturali—

La Gaeta